Fowzieh Khalili (born 10 October 1958 in Madras) is a former Test and One Day International cricketer who has represented India at the international level and Tamil Nadu at the domestic league level.

Career 
She played eight Tests and thirteen One Day Internationals. She holds the record for effecting the most dismissals as wicket-keeper in a single Women's Cricket World Cup series(20)

References

Living people
1958 births
Cricketers from Chennai
Indian women cricketers
Tamil Nadu women cricketers
India women Test cricketers
India women One Day International cricketers
Sportswomen from Tamil Nadu